Paire Football Club is a football club from Saipan in the Northern Mariana Islands. Its men's team competes in the M*League Division 1.

Logo
Paire FC's logo is based on Club Atletico River Plate's logo.

Squad
2017

Former players

Teams

Made up of age groups adjacent to each other, Paire FC incorporates 12 teams including both genders: Under-6, Under-8, Under-10, Under-12 division B, Under-12 Division A, Under-14 Boys, Under-15 Girls, Under-17 Boys and Men's team.

References

 
Football clubs in the Northern Mariana Islands